The Râura is a left tributary of the river Vișa in Romania. It flows into the Vișa near Mândra.

References

Rivers of Romania
Rivers of Sibiu County